Ilya Andreyevich Azyavin (born 24 July 2000) is a Russian footballer who plays as a midfielder for Chelyabinsk on loan from Shinnik Yaroslavl.

Career statistics

Club

Notes

References

2000 births
Sportspeople from Astrakhan
Living people
Russian footballers
Association football midfielders
FC Urozhay Krasnodar players
FC Volgar Astrakhan players
FC Codru Lozova players
FC Shinnik Yaroslavl players
Russian Second League players
Moldovan Super Liga players
Russian First League players
Russian expatriate footballers
Expatriate footballers in Moldova
Russian expatriate sportspeople in Moldova